Ximénez may refer to:

Ximénez (surname), including a list of people with the name
Pedro Ximénez, a variety of grape grown in Spain and a type of sherry
Ximenes (crossword compiler), pseudonym of Derrick Somerset Macnutt
Ximenez-Fatio House, a historic property representing a boarding house from the Florida Territory period

See also
 Jiménez (disambiguation), a variant of Ximénez
 Giménez, a variant of Ximénez